This page is a listing of federal and provincial electoral districts and senate divisions in Canada using the name of Victoria, or located in, the area of the city of Victoria.

Current federal electoral districts

Victoria (electoral district) (first contested in 1924)
Cowichan—Malahat—Langford (2015)
Esquimalt—Saanich—Sooke (2015)
Saanich-Gulf Islands (1996)

Defunct federal electoral districts

Victoria (electoral district) (1872–1903)
Victoria City, a defunct federal electoral district in Victoria, B.C. (1903–1924)
Victoria District, a defunct federal electoral district in greater Victoria, B.C. (1871–1872) 
Esquimalt—Saanich, a defunct federal electoral district in greater Victoria, B.C. (1952–1987)
Saanich-Gulf Islands, a federal electoral district in greater Victoria, B.C. (1987–1996).  Name retained by newer riding (listed above in current ridings) but parts of Esquimalt-Saanich were incorporated into the "new" seat.
Victoria a defunct riding in Northern Alberta

Current provincial electoral districts
Current provincial electoral districts in the city of Victoria
Victoria-Beacon Hill, current provincial electoral district in Victoria, B.C.
Victoria-Swan Lake, current provincial electoral district in Victoria, B.C, comprising much of the former Victoria-Hillside district.
Oak Bay-Gordon Head, current provincial electoral district in Victoria, B.C.
Saanich South, current provincial electoral district in greater Victoria, B.C.
Saanich North and the Islands, current provincial electoral district in greater Victoria, B.C. 
Esquimalt-Metchosin, current provincial electoral district in greater Victoria, B.C.
Langford-Juan de Fuca, current provincial electoral district in greater Victoria, B.C.

Defunct provincial electoral districts
Defunct provincial electoral districts in the city of Victoria British Columbia.

Victoria, defunct provincial electoral district, 1871–1890, 1966–1986
Victoria City, defunct provincial electoral district. 1871–1963
North Victoria, defunct provincial electoral district 1894–1900
Saanich and the Islands, 1966–2001
Saanich, 1953–1988
South Victoria, defunct provincial electoral district 1894–1900
Oak Bay, defunct provincial electoral district 1941–1975
Oak Bay-Gordon Head, 1979–present
Esquimalt, 1871–1975
Esquimalt-Port Renfrew, 1979–1986
Esquimalt-Metchosin, 1991–present

Ridings named Victoria in other Canadian provinces or Territories
Victoria, Northwest Territories (1894–1905)
Victoria, Alberta
Victoria, Ontario (1903–1966)
Victoria, New Brunswick (1867–1914)
Victoria, Nova Scotia

Canadian Senate divisions that have used the name Victoria

Victoria, Quebec a permanent Senate division defined in the Consolidated Statutes 1859 
Victoria, Ontario
Victoria, British Columbia
Victoria, Nova Scotia
Victoria, New Brunswick
Victoria-Carelton, New Brunswick

See also
List of electoral districts on Vancouver Island

References
Electoral History of BC, BC Elections

Greater Victoria
 LISTS
Victoria